The Rollins House is a historic home in Tallahassee, Florida. It is located at 5456 Rollins Pointe. On December 31, 2001, it was added to the U.S. National Register of Historic Places.

References

External links
 Leon County listings at National Register of Historic Places
 Leon County listings at Florida's Office of Cultural and Historical Programs

Historic buildings and structures in Leon County, Florida
Houses on the National Register of Historic Places in Florida
National Register of Historic Places in Tallahassee, Florida
History of Tallahassee, Florida
Houses in Tallahassee, Florida
Houses completed in 1870
Vernacular architecture in Florida
1870 establishments in Florida